Kim Chon-gyun (born 17 March 1960) is a North Korean politician and served as President of the Central Bank of the Democratic People's Republic of Korea since 2014.

In May 2016, he was elected as an alternate member of the Central Committee of the Workers' Party of Korea. He was reelected in March 2019.

References 

 Profile of Kim Chon Gyun

Living people
1960 births
Workers' Party of Korea politicians
Members of the Supreme People's Assembly
North Korean bankers
President of the Central Bank of the Democratic People's Republic of Korea